P. arenaria  may refer to:
 Pavoraja arenaria, the sandy skate, a fish species found out the coast of western Australia
 Potentilla arenaria, a plant species

See also
 Arenaria (disambiguation)